The cinnamon-rumped foliage-gleaner (Philydor pyrrhodes) is a species of bird in the family Furnariidae.
It is found in Bolivia, Brazil, Colombia, Ecuador, French Guiana, Guyana, Peru, Suriname, and Venezuela.
Its natural habitats are subtropical or tropical moist lowland forest and subtropical or tropical swampland.

References

External links
 Image and classification at Animal Diversity Web

cinnamon-rumped foliage-gleaner
Birds of the Amazon Basin
Birds of the Guianas
cinnamon-rumped foliage-gleaner
Birds of Brazil
Taxonomy articles created by Polbot